John Grange may refer to:

John Thomas Grange (1837–1924), Canadian businessman 
John Grange (immunologist) (born 1943), English physician, immunologist and epidemiologist
John Grange (Kansas politician), American Republican